Łękawica is an heraldic ordinary in the shape of 2 joined chevrons, similar to letter W. Usually, it is of the colour of or (gold), azure (blue), or argent (white).

Usage 
It was used in the several coat of arms of heraldic clans of Poland, including: Abdank and its variants, Dębno, and Dowgiałło.

It also appears in the coat of arms of several towns, including Krośniewice and Żary in Poland, Obertyn, Ukraine, and Vietka, Belarus, as well as the municipality of Osięciny, Poland. Additionally, it appears in the emblem of the 58th Independent Motorized Infantry Brigade of the Ukrainian Ground Forces.

Gallery

References

Bibliography 
 K. Niesiecki, Powiększony dodatkami z poźniejszych autorów rękopismów, dowodów, urzędowych i wydany przez Jana Nep. Bobrowicza, J.N. Bobrowicz, vol. 2, Lipsk: Breitkopf i Haertel, 1839.
 Tadeusz Gajl, Herbarz polski od średniowiecza do XX wieku: ponad 4500 herbów szlacheckich 37 tysięcy nazwisk 55 tysięcy rodów. L&L, 2007. .

Polish heraldry
Heraldic ordinaries